Scyliorhinus meadi, the blotched catshark, is a little-known species of catshark, and part of the family Scyliorhinidae, found in the western central Atlantic Ocean. This species can be identified by its wide body and head, and the dark saddle-like markings on its back. It also has small spots that fluoresce yellow under a blue light. Like other catsharks, it is believed to be oviparous. This species is not dangerous to humans and has no commercial significance.

Taxonomy
He named it after Giles W. Mead, who brought the original specimen to his attention. From 1970 to 1979, this species was regarded as a subspecies of the chain catshark (S. retifer).

Distribution and habitat
The blotched catshark has been recorded from North Carolina southward to the Santaren Channel between Florida, the Bahamas, Cuba, as well as in the Cayman Trench off northern Jamaica, and in the Gulf of Mexico north of the Yucatan Peninsula. A bottom-dwelling species, blotched catsharks are usually found amongst deepwater coral banks composed largely of Lophelia pertusa.

Description
This shark has a broad, heavily built head and body, tapering greatly towards the tail. The flaps of skin beside the nares are small and do not reach the mouth. The teeth in the upper jaw are exposed when the mouth is closed, and there are furrows at the corners of the lower jaw.

The first dorsal fin originates over the pelvic fins, while the second dorsal fin originates over the anal fin. The caudal fin is nearly horizontal, with an indistinct lower lobe and a prominent notch near the tip of the upper lobe. The skin is relatively smooth, as the dermal denticles are small and flattened. The coloration consists of a plain dark background with 7–8 darker, more or less prominent saddles. Like the related chain catshark, the blotched catshark exhibits fluorescence, with small spots on its back that glow yellow under a blue light.

Biology and ecology
The blotched catshark preys on cephalopods, shrimp, and bony fishes of surprisingly large size. Its internal anatomy suggests that it lays encapsulated eggs like the other members of its family, though these egg cases have not been observed. The sizes of the known immature specimens suggest that the adults are relatively large.

Human interactions
Harmless to humans and rarely caught by fisheries, the blotched catshark is of no economic importance. It has been assessed as Least Concern by the International Union for Conservation of Nature (IUCN).

See also
Asymbolus funebris, also known as blotched catshark

References

blotched catshark
Fauna of the Southeastern United States
Fauna of the Bahamas
Fish of Cuba
Fish of the Caribbean
Taxa named by Stewart Springer
blotched catshark